Mount Straloch is a mountain on Hinchinbrook Island, off the northeast coast of Queensland, Australia. It rises  out of the Coral Sea.

In 1942, during World War II, an American B-24 Liberator bomber of the United States Army Air Force crashed into a mountain on the island, killing all 12 crewmen on board.

See also

 List of mountains of Australia

References

Straloch